Guttman is a surname.  It may refer to:

Amos Guttman (1954-1993), Israeli film director
Bela Guttman (1899-1981), Hungarian football manager
David Guttman (1883-1940), Swedish long-distance runner
Egon Guttman (born 1927), American law professor
Eli Guttman (born 1958), Israeli football manager
Elizabeth Guttman (born 1961), American actress with the stage name Elizabeth Daily
Freda Guttman (born 1934), Canadian multidisciplinary artist and activist
Howard M. Guttman (born 1951), American management consultant
Irving Guttman (1928-2014), Canadian stage director
Louis Guttman (1916-1987), Israeli sociologist, inventor of the Guttman scale
Norman Guttman (1920-1982), American psychologist
Peter Guttman (photographer), American photographer
Reuben Guttman (born 1959), American attorney
Ronald Guttman (born 1952), Belgian actor and producer
Shmarya Guttman (1909-1996), Israeli archaeologist

See also 
Guttman scale
Gutman
Gutmann (disambiguation)
Guttmann
Gutt

Surnames